Satyameva Jayate (English: Truth will win) is a Telugu film and remake of 2004 Hindi movie Khakee, starring Rajasekhar, Shivaji, Sai Kiran, Neetu Chandra, Sanjjanaa Galrani and Sheryl Pinto. It was directed by Jeevita with music composed by Chinna. The movie did not fare well at the box office.

Plot 
DCP Sathya (Dr Rajashekhar) and his team are on an escorting mission to safely bring Ansari (Atul Kulkarni) from Vizag to Hyderabad. Ranadev (Milind Soman) and his team are out to eliminate Ansari on the orders of the Home minister (Sayaji Shinde). How DCP Sathya saves Ansari and the repercussions form the story.

Cast
Rajasekhar as DCP Sathya
Shivaji as Prathap
Neetu Chandra as Basara Papa
Sanjjanaa Galrani as Sanjana
Milind Soman as Ranadev (International Terrorist)
Sayaji Shinde as Anand Rao
Atul Kulkarni as Dr. Iqbal Ansari
Sheryl Pinto
Sai Kiran as Police Officer in DSP Sathya team
Brahmanandam
Ahuti Prasad as Swamy Naidu IPS (Commissioner)

Production
Rajasekhar revealed that he took the basic plot of Khakee and he himself created a different screenplay for Telugu version.

Soundtrack
The music was composed by S. Chinna and released by Aditya Music.

References

External links
 

2009 films
Indian action films
2000s Telugu-language films
Telugu remakes of Hindi films
2009 action films